Oranżada is a Polish term for carbonated soft drinks. The origins of the word come from the 18th century, when carbonated orange soft drinks made of water, sugar, and orange syrup were introduced from France. Today, it is mostly associated with Red (or "Ciuciu") Orangeade, a red-to-pink coloured soft drink flavoured with vegetable extracts and juices (including black carrot juice) which was invented during the Polish People's Republic due to shortages and high prices of imported fruit that was used to make the original orange-flavoured drink.

Polish drinks
Soft drinks